MT-RNR2-like 1 is a protein that in humans is encoded by the MTRNR2L1 gene.

References

Further reading